Jack Gantos (born July 2, 1951)  is an American author of children's books. He is best known for the fictional characters Rotten Ralph and Joey Pigza. Rotten Ralph is a cat who stars in twenty picture books written by Gantos and illustrated by Nicole Rubel from 1976 to 2014. Joey Pigza is a boy with attention-deficit hyperactivity disorder (ADHD), featured in five novels from 1998 to 2014.

Gantos won the 2012 Newbery Medal from the American Library Association (ALA), recognizing Dead End in Norvelt as the previous year's "most distinguished contribution to American literature for children". Dead End also won the 2012 Scott O'Dell Award for Historical Fiction and made the Guardian Prize longlist in Britain.

His 2002 memoir Hole in My Life was a runner up Honor Book for the ALA Printz Award and Sibert Medal. Previously Gantos was a finalist for the U.S. National Book Award and a finalist for the Newbery Medal for two Joey Pigza books.

Biography
Jack Gantos was born in Mount Pleasant, Pennsylvania, near Pittsburgh to construction superintendent John and banker Elizabeth Gantos. He was raised in South Florida and the Caribbean, and followed his parents to St. Croix in the Virgin Islands. He got involved in the drug trade there, and ended up in New York City. After serving one and a half years of a six-year sentence he entered college and continued writing, finally publishing  his first book, Rotten Ralph, in 1976. The latest Rotten Ralph book was published in 2014; there are now 20 titles in the series for young readers. Gantos has written for readers of all ages, including the memoir Hole in My Life, published in 2002.

During that time he began to work on picture books with Nicole Rubel, a student at the Boston Museum School. Rotten Ralph was the first to be published, by Houghton Mifflin in 1976. Within ten years Gantos and Rubel completed some twenty picture books including two more in the Rotten Ralph series. Meanwhile, Gantos began teaching about writing children's books. He was professor of creative writing and literature (1978–95) at Emerson College in Boston, and a visiting professor at Brown University (1986), University of New Mexico (1993), and Vermont College of Fine Arts (2004). He developed master's degree programs in children's book writing at both Emerson College and Vermont College.

Awards and honors
 
Best Books for Young Readers citation, American Library Association (ALA), 1976–93, for the "Rotten Ralph" series.
Children's Book Showcase Award, 1977, for Rotten Ralph
Emerson Alumni Award, Emerson College, 1979, for Outstanding Achievement in Creative Writing
Massachusetts Council for the Arts Awards finalist, 1983, 1988
Gold Key Honors Society Award, 1985, for Creative Excellence
National Endowment for the Arts grant, 1987
Quarterly West Novella Award, 1989, for X-Rays
Children's Choice citation, International Reading Association, 1990, for Rotten Ralph's Show and Tell
Batavia Educational Foundation grant, 1991
West Springfield Arts Council (WESPAC) grant, 1991
Parents' Choice citation, 1994, for Not So Rotten Ralph
New York Public Library Books for the Teenage, 1997, for Jack's Black Book
Silver Award, 1999, for Jack on the Tracks
finalist, 1998 National Book Award for Young People's Literature, for Joey Pigza Swallowed the Key
Great Stone Face Award, Children's Librarians of New Hampshire,  ALANNA Notable Children's Book, NCSS and CBC Notable Children's Trade Book in the Field of Social Studies, School Library Journal Best Book of the Year, Riverbank Review Children's Book of Distinction, and New York Public Library "One Hundred Titles for Reading and Sharing," all 1999, for Joey Pigza Swallowed the Key
Iowa Teen Award, Iowa Educational Media Association, Flicker Tale Children's Book Award nomination, North Dakota Library Association, and Sasquatch Award nomination, all 2000, for Joey Pigza Swallowed the Key
Newbery Honor, ALANNA, 2001, for Joey Pigza Loses Control
California Young Reader Medal, 2002, for Joey Pigza Swallowed the Key
Printz Honor, 2003, for Hole in My Life
Sibert Honor, 2003, for Hole in My Life
National Endowment for the Arts Fellowship for Creative Writing, m fiction
 Newbery Medal, 2012, for Dead End In Norvelt
 Scott O'Dell Award for Historical Fiction, 2012, for Dead End in Norvelt
 Guardian Children's Fiction Prize longlist, 2012, for Dead End in Norvelt
 Anne V. Zarrow Award for Young Readers' Literature, 2014, career award

Selected works

Picture books
Gantos is the author of dozens of published picture books including about twenty illustrated by Nicole Rubel. Rotten Ralph was the first published book for both creators and the first of about ten in the Rotten Ralph series as of 2012.

Rotten Ralph series by Gantos and Rubel
 Rotten Ralph (Houghton Mifflin, 1976)introducing the "very, very, nasty cat"
 Three Strikes for Rotten Ralph (Farrar, Straus and Giroux, 2011)the latest of about ten
 Rotten Ralph's Rotten Family (Farrar, Straus and Giroux, 2014)

Novels

Nonfiction 

, a memoir
Writing Radar: Using Your Journal to Snoop Out and Craft Great Stories (2017)

Notes

References
 Contemporary Authors Online, Gale, 2006. Reproduced in Biography Resource Center. Farmington Hills, Mich.: Thomson Gale. 2006.
 Gantos, Jack. Hole in My Life. New York: Farrar, Straus and Giroux (Books for Young Readers). 2002.

External links
 
 
 Hole in my Life at publisher Macmillan
 Webcast of Gantos at the Library of Congress
 Jack Gantos to Publish New Joey Pigza Book 

 

1951 births
Living people
American children's writers
Newbery Medal winners
Newbery Honor winners
Emerson College alumni
Writers from Pittsburgh
People from Mount Pleasant, Pennsylvania
20th-century American novelists
21st-century American novelists
American male novelists
Novelists from Pennsylvania
20th-century American male writers
21st-century American male writers